"Top Gun Anthem" is an instrumental rock composition and the theme of the Top Gun media franchise, including the original 1986 film Top Gun and its 2022 sequel Maverick. Harold Faltermeyer wrote the music with Steve Stevens playing guitar and Faltermeyer on the keyboard on the recording. In the film, the full song is heard in the film's ending scene.

Overview 
An edited version of the song without the electric guitar is played in the opening sequence set aboard the aircraft carrier deck during launch preparations - the music is set so that after the F-14 Tomcat's engines are on full afterburner and the aircraft subsequently launches from the catapult, it immediately changes to "Danger Zone" by Kenny Loggins. This edited version would re-appear in a similar fashion during the opening scene of Top Gun: Maverick, but with F/A-18 E/F Super Hornets and F-35s replacing the F-14s.

In an interview for RedBull Academy in 2014, Faltermeyer recalled simultaneously recording keyboard parts for Billy Idol's Whiplash Smile while also composing a melody for a scene in the movie Fletch. Idol passed by the control room on a break and opened the door for a listen. He liked the melody and pumped his fist in the air, saying it was "Top Gun". In a 2022 interview with AXS TV, Stevens said Faltermeyer showed him a Betamax copy of the film's workprint and offered him to record the guitar section of the song.

Achievements  
"Top Gun Anthem" won a 1987 Grammy Award for Best Pop Instrumental Performance.

Music video
The song's music video, directed by Dominic Sena, shows Faltermeyer playing the piano and Stevens on electric guitar in a hangar with naval aircraft. This video was re-released within the 2004 Top Gun Collector's Edition DVD.

Stevens used a Hamer SS signature guitar in the music video but for the recording he used his Charvel San Dimas Glow and a 100-watt Marshall amplifier to record his part.  He also used a Boss compressor pedal to add more sustain. There is only one guitar track throughout the entire piece, with the exception of the ending.

Availability
The song is available on both the original Top Gun soundtrack album and the expanded edition. A re-recorded version is also available on the soundtrack, Top Gun: Maverick (Music From the Motion Picture).

Personnel
 Harold Faltermeyer – keyboards, synthesizers, Roland TR-808 programming 
 Steve Stevens – electric guitar

Other uses
The theme was used in Bollywood movie Darr.

The theme was played on organ as an intro to "Don't Need a Gun" during Billy Idol's Whiplash Smile tour.

A similar tune was found in the 1988 Amiga flight simulator F/A-18 Interceptor.

Rapper T.I. sampled the guitar riff for his song "Big Things Poppin'."

On July 3, 2008, Activision released a free downloadable version of the "Top Gun Anthem" covered by Steve Ouimette for both the PlayStation 3 and Xbox 360 versions of Guitar Hero III: Legends of Rock.

A remixed version of the song is featured as the official soundtrack for the Top Gun: Maverick DLC in Ace Combat 7: Skies Unknown, alongside "Danger Zone".

Charts

References 

1986 songs
1980s instrumentals
Glam metal songs
Music videos directed by Dominic Sena
Rock instrumentals
Songs from Top Gun
Songs written by Harold Faltermeyer
Songs written for films
Film theme songs
Columbia Records singles